may refer to:

 Sociedade de Cultura Artística, a Brazilian cultural organization
 Teatro Cultura Artística, a theater in São Paulo, Brazil